Anthony Nicholls (16 October 1902 – 22 February 1977) was an English actor.

Life and career
Nicholls was born 16 October 1902 in Windsor, Berkshire, England, the son of Florence (née Holderness) and photojournalist Horace Nicholls. Distinguishing himself on the Shakespearean stage alongside the Redgrave family, Laurence Olivier and Peter O'Toole. In addition he played R Austin Freeman's Doctor Thorndyke on BBC Radio in Mr Pottermack's Oversight, in 1963. The episode was preserved.

American audiences first saw Nicholls in the company of Ronald Reagan, Richard Todd and Patricia Neal in The Hasty Heart (1949). He made his television debut in 1949 and continued with steady work as an actor for the rest of his life, including the film A Man For All Seasons (1966). In the television series The Champions, he played the role of W.Lawrence Tremayne, the overseer of three top secret agents.

Personal life
Nicholls married actress Faith Kent on 29 September, 1947.  They had two daughters, Kate Nicholls (born 1954) and actress Phoebe Nicholls (born 1957) two of whose children are actors: son Tom Sturridge and daughter Matilda Sturridge. Anthony Nicholls died at age 74 on 22 February 1977.

Filmography

 1946: The Laughing Lady .... Mr Pitt
 1948: The Guinea Pig .... Mr Stringer
 1949: Man on the Run .... Wapping Station Inspector
 1949:	The Hasty Heart .... Lt. Col. Dunn
 1950: No Place for Jennifer .... Baxter
 1950: The Dancing Years .... Prince Reinaldt
 1950: The Woman with No Name .... Doctor
 1950: Portrait of Clare .... Dr Boyd
 1951: The Franchise Affair .... Kevin McDermott
 1951: High Treason .... Grant Mansfield
 1952: The Woman's Angle .... Nigel Jarvis
 1953: Street Corner
 1953: The House of the Arrow .... Lawyer Jarrett
 1954: The Weak and the Wicked .... Prison Chaplain
 1954: Happy Ever After .... Solicitor
 1954: The Green Scarf .... Goirin
 1954: Make Me an Offer .... Auctioneer
 1958: The Safecracker .... General Prior
 1958: Dunkirk .... Military spokesman
 1961: Seven Keys .... Governor
 1961: Victim .... Lord Fullbrook
 1962: Night of the Eagle .... Harvey Sawtelle
 1964: The Pumpkin Eater .... Surgeon
 1965: Othello .... Brabantio
 1966: A Man for All Seasons .... King's Representative
 1967: Mister Ten Per Cent .... Casey
 1967: Our Mother's House .... Mr Halbert
 1968: If.... .... General Denson: Staff
 1969: Battle of Britain .... Minister
 1969: A Walk with Love and Death .... Father Superior
 1970: The Man Who Haunted Himself .... Sir Arthur Richardson
 1970: One More Time .... Candler
 1970: The Walking Stick .... Lewis Maud
 1973: O Lucky Man! .... General / Judge
 1976: The Omen .... Doctor Becker

Television

 1949: The Time Machine .... Psychologist
 1955: Portrait of Alison .... Major Colby
 1957: Sword of Freedom .... Zanobi
 1961: Walt Disney's Wonderful World of Color .... Hardy Cole
 1963–1966: The Saint .... Lord Cranmore / George Marsh
 1963–1968: The Avengers .... Dr Ardmore / Dr Shanklin
 1967: Man in a Suitcase .... Sir Walter Fenchurch
 1968–1969: The Champions .... Cmdr. W.L. Tremayne
 1970: Department S .... Dr. Grant
 1970: Callan (Series 3 Episode 6) .... Heathcote Land
 1973: Z-Cars .... Hugo Vallance
 1973: Merchant of Venice .... Antonio
 1973: Softly Softly .... Judge
 1974: Special Branch .... Colonel Lang
 1975: Play of the Month – King Lear .... Earl of Gloucester
 1976: Space: 1999 .... James Warren
 1976: The Crezz .... Cyril Antrobus

Stage
 1964: Hay Fever'' .... David Bliss (National Theatre)

References

External links

1902 births
1977 deaths
English male film actors
English male stage actors
English male television actors
People from Windsor, Berkshire
20th-century English male actors
Male actors from Berkshire
Royal Artillery personnel
British Army personnel of World War II
Military personnel from Berkshire